Jeremy Levy (born in 1965 New York City, United States)  is an American physicist who is a Distinguished Professor of Physics at the University of Pittsburgh.

Education and career 
Prof. Jeremy Levy received his B.A. degree from Harvard University (1988), and his Ph.D. in Physics from University of California Santa Barbara (1993) under the supervision of Prof. Mark Sherwin. After his Ph.D., he was a postdoctoral researcher at the University of California Santa Barbara  with Prof. David Awschalom. He started his independent academic career as an Assistant Professor in Physics in 1996 and currently Distinguished Professor of Physics in the Department of Physics and Astronomy at the University of Pittsburgh.  He also holds an Adjunct Faculty position in both Physics and Electrical and Computer Engineering departments at Carnegie Mellon University.

Early acting career 
Jeremy Levy also worked as a film and television actor from age 11-12. He acted in the NBC Holocaust (miniseries) (1978), and played the role of Aaron Feldman. He also had a lead role in the feature film Rich Kids (film) (1979), playing the role of Jamie Harris. His Bacon number is "2".

Other professional activities 
Apart from his research, Levy served for a decade as Founding Director of the Pittsburgh Quantum Institute (PQI) from 2012-2022, whose mission is “to help unify and promote quantum science and engineering in Pittsburgh.”  PQI has over 100 Faculty members in multiple departments at the University of Pittsburgh, Carnegie Mellon University, and Duquesne University.

Areas of research 
Levy's research interests center around the emerging field of oxide nanoelectronics, experimental and theoretical realizations for quantum computation, semiconductor and oxide spintronics, quantum transport and nanoscale optics, and dynamical phenomena in oxide materials and films. 
Levy’s early Ph.D. research focused on the nonlinear dynamical properties of sliding charge-density waves. His postdoctoral research investigated the properties of dilute magnetic semiconductor heterostructures, where he developed a low-temperature near-field scanning optical microscope and used it to investigate Mn-doped ZnSe/(Zn,Cd)Se heterostructure and superlattices as well as self-assembled quantum dots.

After moving to the University of Pittsburgh, Levy began a research program centered around high-resolution imaging of the spatial and temporal dynamics of ferroelectric thin films. In 1999, Levy worked toward an experimental realization of a quantum computer based on ferroelectrically coupled Ge/Si quantum dots. Levy was funded through the DARPA QuIST program that supported the Center for Oxide-Semiconductor Materials for Quantum Computation, which Levy directed for 10 years.  During that time, Levy initiated a theoretical research effort aimed at developing various families of logical qubits based on spin pairs, spin clusters, cluster-state qubits, and dimerized spin chains.

In 2006, Levy visited the group of Prof. Dr. Jochen Mannhart who had discovered a sharp insulator-to-metal transition in oxide heterostructure composed of a thin layer of LaAlO3 grown on TiO2-terminated SrTiO3.  The 3-unit-cell LaAlO3/SrTiO3 was metastable and could be switched with a voltage applied to the back of the SrTiO3substrate.  Levy and his student Cheng Cen showed that a biased conductive atomic force microscope tip could locally switch the interface of the 3-unit-cell LaAlO3/SrTiO3 heterostructure system, thus launching a new field that Levy refers to as “Correlated Nanoelectronics”.

Other areas of research 
Levy has conducted research in a variety of areas:
 Apertureless near-field scanning optical microscopy, applied principally to polar nanodomains in ferroelectric thin films.
 Development of g-tensor modulation resonance as a method for all-electrical control of spin in semiconductor heterostructure.
 Development of conductive-AFM lithography for extreme nanoscale control of the metal-insulator transition in LaAlO3/SrTiO3 heterostructure.
 Discovery of room-temperature electronically controlled ferromagnetism in LaAlO3/SrTiO3 heterostructure.
 Development of sketched LaAlO3/SrTiO3 single-electron transistors, electron waveguides, and other mesoscopic physics devices
 Discovery of electron pairing without superconductivity in sketched LaAlO3/SrTiO3 devices.
 Development of 100 THz-bandwidth generation and detection of THz emission in nanoscale LaAlO3/SrTiO3 junctions

Personal life 
Levy was born in New York City. In 1990, he married Chandralekha Singh who is also a physicist and currently a Distinguished Professor in the Department of Physics and Astronomy at the University of Pittsburgh. They were classmates in the Ph.D. program at the University of California Santa Barbara. They have two sons, Akash Levy and Ishan Levy who did their undergraduates at Princeton University. Akash currently is a Ph.D. candidate in Electrical Engineering at Stanford University, and Ishan is a Ph.D. candidate in Mathematics at Massachusetts Institute of Technology. Apart from physics research, Jeremy Levy is an avid soccer player, and enjoys making videos on various subjects.

Awards and honors 
 Fellow, American Association for the Advancement of Science, 2018
 Fellow, Vannevar Bush Faculty, class of 2015
 Chancellor's Distinguished Research Award (Senior Category), University of Pittsburgh, 2011
 Fellow, American Physical Society (DCMP), 2009
 Nano 50 Innovator Award, 2008
 Chancellor's Distinguished Teaching Award, University of Pittsburgh, 2007
 Chancellor's Distinguished Research Award (Junior Category), University of Pittsburgh, 2004
 NSF CAREER Award, 1997

References 

1965 births
Living people
21st-century American physicists
20th-century American physicists
Harvard University alumni
University of California, Santa Barbara alumni
University of Pittsburgh faculty
Carnegie Mellon University faculty
20th-century American male actors
Scientists from New York City
Distinguished professors in the United States
Fellows of the American Physical Society